Melanotus fuscus, is a species of click beetle found in India, China, Indonesia, Laos, Myanmar, Sri Lanka, Cambodia and Thailand.

References 

Elateridae
Insects of Sri Lanka
Insects described in 1801